Apache TomEE (pronounced "Tommy") is the Java Enterprise Edition of Apache Tomcat (Tomcat + Jakarta EE = TomEE) that combines several Java enterprise projects including Apache OpenEJB, Apache OpenWebBeans, Apache OpenJPA, Apache MyFaces and others. In October 2011, the project obtained certification by Oracle Corporation as a compatible implementation of the Java EE 6 Web Profile.

Components 

TomEE includes the following open-source components:

TomEE JAX-RS, a second distribution, adds support for Java API for RESTful Web Services (JAX-RS).

The full TomEE Plus distribution adds additional support for:

 Java API for XML Web Services (JAX-WS)
 Java EE Connector Architecture
 Java Messaging Service (JMS)

History 

The OpenEJB project was started by Richard Monson-Haefel and David Blevins in 1999 as an open source implementation of the Enterprise JavaBeans specification.  Blevins continued to develop OpenEJB and integrate components of this project with Apache Geronimo.  In 2003, the OpenEJB component became a project operating under the auspices of the Apache Software Foundation at which time it was rewritten with a focus on leveraging Tomcat as an embedded web container.  A beta version of TomEE was released in October 2011, and the first production-ready version was shipped in April 2012.

Versions

Commercial support 

Two years after the announcement of Apache TomEE at JavaOne 2011 several Apache TomEE creators united to form Tomitribe, a commercial support company dedicated to the Apache TomEE community and focused on promoting open source values.

Another commercial support company provides enterprise support for Apache TomEE is ManageCat,.  ManageCat involves with a lot of Apache Java EE projects to contribute open source Java EE ecosystem.

See also 

 List of application servers

References

External links

Apache TomEE - Tomcat with a Kick at JAXLondon 2011
Apache TomEE Java EE 6 Web Profile at JavaOne 2011

TomEE
Java enterprise platform
Free software application servers